An intergenic region is a stretch of DNA sequences located between genes. Intergenic regions may contain functional elements and  junk DNA. Intergenic regions should not be confused with intragenic regions (or introns), which are non-coding regions that are found within genes, especially within the genes of eukaryotic organisms.

Properties and functions 
Intergenic regions may contain a number of functional DNA sequences such as  promoters and regulatory elements, enhancers, spacers, and (in eukaryotes)  centromeres. They may also contain  origins of replication,  scaffold attachment regions, and  transposons and viruses. Non-functional DNA elements such as  pseudogenes and  repetitive DNA, both of which are types of  junk DNA, can also be found in intergenic regions—although they may also be located within genes in introns.
	
As all scientific knowledge is ultimately tentative—and in principle subject to revision given better evidence—it is possible some well-characterized intergenic regions (but also intra-genic regions like introns) may hypothetically contain as yet unidentified functional elements, such as non-coding RNA genes or regulatory sequences. Such discoveries occur from time to time, but the amount of functional DNA discovered usually constitute only a tiny fraction of the overall amount of intergenic/intronic DNA.

Intergenic regions in different organisms 
In humans, intergenic regions comprise about  50% of the genome, whereas this number is much less in bacteria (15%) and yeast (30%).

As with most other non-coding DNA, the GC-content of intergenic regions vary considerably among species. For example in Plasmodium falciparum, many intergenic regions have an AT content of 90%.

Molecular evolution of Intergenic regions 
Functional elements in intergenic regions will evolve slowly because their sequence is maintained by  negative selection. In species with very large genomes, a large percentage of intergenic regions is probably Junk DNA and it will evolve at the neutral rate of evolution. Junk DNA sequences are not maintained by  purifying selection but gain-of-function mutations with deleterious fitness effects can occur. 

Phylostratigraphic inference and bioinformatics methods have shown that intergenic regions can—on geological timescales—transiently evolve into open reading frame sequences that mimic those of protein coding genes, and can therefore lead to the evolution of novel protein-coding genes in a process known as de novo gene birth.

See also 
 Exon
 Promoter (biology)
 ENCODE
 Heterochromatin
 Noncoding DNA
 Repetitive DNA
 Regulator gene
 Whole genome sequencing

References

External links 
 ENCODE threads Explorer Characterization of intergenic regions and gene definition. Nature (journal)

DNA
Molecular biology